Euclid (BC) was an ancient Greek mathematician active as a geometer and logician. Considered the "father of geometry", he is chiefly known for the Elements treatise, which established the foundations of geometry that largely dominated the field until the early 19th century. His system, now referred to as Euclidean geometry, involved new innovations in combination with a synthesis of theories from earlier Greek mathematicians, including Eudoxus of Cnidus, Hippocrates of Chios, Thales and Theaetetus. With Archimedes and Apollonius of Perga, Euclid is generally considered among the greatest mathematicians of antiquity, and one of the most influential in the history of mathematics.

Very little is known of Euclid's life, and most information comes from the philosophers Proclus and Pappus of Alexandria many centuries later. Until the early Renaissance he was often mistaken for the earlier philosopher Euclid of Megara, causing his biography to be substantially revised. It is generally agreed that he spent his career under Ptolemy I in Alexandria and lived around 300 BC, after Plato and before Archimedes. There is some speculation that Euclid was a student of the Platonic Academy and later taught at the Musaeum. Euclid is often regarded as bridging the earlier Platonic tradition in Athens with the later tradition of Alexandria.

In the Elements, Euclid deduced the theorems from a small set of axioms. He also wrote works on perspective, conic sections, spherical geometry, number theory, and mathematical rigour. In addition to the Elements, Euclid wrote a central early text in the optics field, Optics, and lesser-known works including Data and Phaenomena. Euclid's authorship of two other texts—On Divisions of Figures, Catoptrics—has been questioned. He is thought to have written many now lost works.

Life

Traditional narrative

The English name 'Euclid' is the anglicized version of the Ancient Greek name Εὐκλείδης. It is derived from 'eu-' (εὖ; 'well') and 'klês' (-κλῆς; 'fame'), meaning "renowned, glorious". The word 'Euclid' less commonly also means "a copy of the same", and is sometimes synonymous with 'geometry'.

Like many ancient Greek mathematicians, Euclid's life is mostly unknown. He is accepted as the author of four mostly extant treatises—the Elements, Optics, Data, Phaenomena—but besides this, there is nothing known for certain of him. The historian Carl Benjamin Boyer has noted irony in that "Considering the fame of the author and of his best seller [the Elements], remarkably little is known of Euclid". The traditional narrative mainly follows the 5th century AD account by Proclus in his Commentary on the First Book of Euclid's Elements, as well as a few anecdotes from Pappus of Alexandria in the early 4th century. According to Proclus, Euclid lived after the philosopher Plato ( BC) and before the mathematician Archimedes ( BC); specifically, Proclus placed Euclid during the rule of Ptolemy I ( BC). In his Collection, Pappus indicates that Euclid was active in Alexandria, where he founded a mathematical tradition. Thus, the traditional outline—described by the historian Michalis Sialaros as the "dominant view"—holds that Euclid lived around 300 BC in Alexandria while Ptolemy I reigned.

Euclid's birthdate is unknown; some scholars estimate around 330 or 325 BC, but other sources avoid speculating a date entirely. It is presumed that he was of Greek descent, but his birthplace is unknown. Proclus held that Euclid followed the Platonic tradition, but there is no definitive confirmation for this. It is unlikely he was contemporary with Plato, so it is often presumed that he was educated by Plato's disciples at the Platonic Academy in Athens. The historian Thomas Heath supported this theory by noting that most capable geometers lived in Athens, which included many of the mathematicians whose work Euclid later built on. The accuracy of these assertions has been questioned by Sialaros, who stated that Heath's theory "must be treated merely as a conjecture". Regardless of his actual attendance at the Platonic academy, the contents of his later work certainly suggest he was familiar with the Platonic geometry tradition, though they also demonstrate no observable influence from Aristotle.

Alexander the Great founded Alexandria in 331 BC, where Euclid would later be active sometime around 300 BC. The rule of Ptolemy I from 306 BC onwards gave the city a stability which was relatively unique in the Mediterranean, amid the chaotic wars over dividing Alexander's empire. Ptolemy began a process of hellenization and commissioned numerous constructions, building the massive Musaeum institution, which was a leading center of education. On the basis of later anecdotes, Euclid is thought to have been among the Musaeum's first scholars and to have founded the Alexandrian school of mathematics there. According to Pappus, the later mathematician Apollonius of Perga was taught there by pupils of Euclid. Euclid's date of death is unknown; it has been estimated that he died  BC, presumably in Alexandria.

Identity and historicity

Euclid is often referred to as 'Euclid of Alexandria' to differentiate him from the earlier philosopher Euclid of Megara, a pupil of Socrates who was included in the dialogues of Plato. Historically, medieval scholars frequently confused the mathematician and philosopher, mistakenly referring to the former in Latin as 'Megarensis'. As a result, biographical information on the mathematician Euclid was long conflated with the lives of both Euclid of Alexandria and Euclid of Megara. The only scholar of antiquity known to have confused the mathematician and philosopher was Valerius Maximus. However, this mistaken identification was relayed by many anonymous Byzantine sources and the Renaissance scholars Campanus of Novara and Theodore Metochites, which was included in a of 1482 translation of the latter by Erhard Ratdolt. After the mathematician  (1473–1539) affirmed this presumption in his 1505 translation, all subsequent publications passed on this identification. Later Renaissance scholars, particularly Peter Ramus, reevaluated this claim, proving it false via issues in chronology and contradiction in early sources.

Arab sources written many centuries after his death give vast amounts of information concerning Euclid's life, but are completely unverifiable. Most scholars consider them of dubious authenticity; Heath in particular contends that the fictionalization was done to strengthen the connection between a revered mathematician and the Arab world. There are also numerous anecdotal stories concerning to Euclid, all of uncertain historicity, which "picture him as a kindly and gentle old man". The best known of these is Proclus' story about Ptolemy asking Euclid if there was a quicker path to learning geometry than reading his Elements, which Euclid replied with "there is no royal road to geometry". This anecdote is questionable since a very similar interaction between Menaechmus and Alexander the Great is recorded from Stobaeus. Both the accounts were written in the 5th century AD, neither indicate their source, and neither story appears in ancient Greek literature.

The traditional narrative of Euclid's activity  is complicated by no mathematicians of the 4th century BC indicating his existence. Mathematicians of the 3rd century such as Archimedes and Apollonius "assume a part of his work to be known"; however, Archimedes strangely uses an older theory of proportions, rather than that of Euclid. The Elements is dated to have been at least partly in circulation by the 3rd century BC. Some ancient Greek mathematician mention him by name, but he is usually referred to as "ὁ στοιχειώτης" ("the author of Elements"). In the Middle Ages, some scholars contended Euclid was not a historical personage and that his name arose from a corruption of Greek mathematical terms.

Works

Elements 

Euclid is best known for his thirteen-book treatise, the Elements, considered his magnum opus. Much of its content originates from earlier mathematicians, including Eudoxus, Hippocrates of Chios, Thales and Theaetetus, while other theorems are mentioned by Plato and Aristotle. It is difficult to differentiate the work of Euclid from that of his predecessors, especially because the Elements essentially superseded much earlier and now-lost Greek mathematics. The classicist Markus Asper concludes that "apparently Euclid's achievement consists of assembling accepted mathematical knowledge into a cogent order and adding new proofs to fill in the gaps" and the mathematician Serafina Cuomo described it as a "reservoir of results". Despite this, Sialaros furthers that "the remarkably tight structure of the Elements reveals authorial control beyond the limits of a mere editor".

The Elements does not exclusively discuss geometry as is sometimes believed. It is traditionally divided into three topics: plane geometry (books 1–6), basic arithmetic (books 7–10:) and solid geometry (books 11–13)—though book 5 (on proportions) and 10 (on irrational lines) do not exactly fit this scheme. The heart of the text is the theorems scattered throughout. Using Aristotle's terminology, these may be generally separated into two categories: "first principles" and "second principles". The first group includes statements labeled as a "definition" ( or ), "postulate", or a "common notion"; only the first book includes postulates—later known as axioms—and common notions. The second group consists of propositions, presented alongside mathematical proofs and diagrams. It is unknown if Euclid intended the Elements as a textbook, but its method of presentation makes it a natural fit. As a whole, the authorial voice remains general and impersonal.

Contents

Book 1 of the Elements is foundational for the entire text. It begins with a series of 20 definitions for basic geometric concepts such as lines, angles and various regular polygons. Euclid then presents 10 assumptions (see table, right), grouped into five postulates (axioms) and five common notions. These assumptions are intended to provide the logical basis for every subsequent theorem, i.e. serve as an axiomatic system. The common notions exclusively concern the comparison of magnitudes. While postulates 1 through 4 are relatively straight forward, the 5th is known as the parallel postulate and particularly famous. Book 1 also includes 48 propositions, which can be loosely divided into those concerning basics theorems of plane geometry (1–26); theories on parallel lines (27–32); theories on parallelograms (33–45); and the Pythagorean theorem (46–48). The last of these includes the earliest surviving proof of the Pythagorean theorem, described by Sialaros as "remarkably delicate".

Book 2 is traditionally understood as concerning geometric algebra, though this interpretation has been heavily debated since the 1970s; critics describe the characterization as anachronistic, since the foundations of even nascent algebra occurred many centuries later. The second book has a more focused scope and mostly provides algebraic theorems to accompany various geometric shapes. Book 3 focuses on circles, while the 4th discusses regular polygons, especially the pentagon. Book 5 is among the work's most important sections and presents what is usually termed as the "general theory of proportion". Book 6 utilizes the "theory of ratios" in the context of plane geometry. It is built almost entirely of its first proposition: "Triangles and parallelograms which are under the same height are to one another as their bases".

From Book 7 onwards, the mathematician  notes that "Euclid starts afresh. Nothing from the preceding books is used". Number theory is covered by books 7 to 10, the former beginning with a set of 22 definitions for parity, prime numbers and other arithmetic-related concepts. Book 7 includes the Euclidean algorithm, a method for finding the greatest common divisor of two numbers. The 8th book discusses geometric progressions, while book 9 includes a proof that there are an infinite amount of prime numbers.

Of the Elements, book 10 is by far the largest and most complex, dealing with irrational numbers in the context of magnitudes.

Books 11 through 13 primarily discuss solid geometry.

Other works 

In addition to the Elements, at least five works of Euclid have survived to the present day. They follow the same logical structure as Elements, with definitions and proved propositions.
 Catoptrics concerns the mathematical theory of mirrors, particularly the images formed in plane and spherical concave mirrors, though the attribution is sometimes questioned.
 The Data, is a somewhat short text which deals with the nature and implications of "given" information in geometrical problems.
 On Divisions survives only partially in Arabic translation, and concerns the division of geometrical figures into two or more equal parts or into parts in given ratios. It includes thirty-six propositions and is similar to Apollonius' Conics.
 The Optics is the earliest surviving Greek treatise on perspective. It includes an introductory discussion of geometrical optics and basic rules of perspective.
 The Phaenomena is a treatise on spherical astronomy, survives in Greek; it is similar to On the Moving Sphere by Autolycus of Pitane, who flourished around 310 BC.

Lost works 
Four other works are credibly attributed to Euclid, but have been lost.
 The Conics was a four-book survey on conic sections, which was later superseded by Apollonius' more comprehensive treatment of the same name. The work's existence is known primarily from Pappus, who asserts that the first four books of Apollonius' Conics are largely based on Euclid's earlier work. Doubt has been cast on this assertion by the historian , owing to sparse evidence and no other corroboration of Pappus' account.
 The Pseudaria, was—according to Proclus in (70.1–18)—a text in geometrical reasoning, written to advise beginners in avoiding common fallacies. Very little is known of its specific contents aside from its scope and a few extant lines.
 The Porisms was, based on accounts from Pappus and Proclus, probably a three-book treatise with approximately 200 propositions. The term 'porism' in this context does not refer to a corollary, but to "a third type of proposition—an intermediate between a theorem and a problem—the aim of which is to discover a feature of an existing geometrical entity, for example, to find the centre of a circle". The mathematician Michel Chasles speculated that these now-lost propositions included content related to the modern theories of transversals and projective geometry.
 The Surface Loci is of virtually unknown contents, aside from speculation based on the work's title. Conjecture based on later accounts has suggested it discussed cones and cylinders, among other subjects.

Legacy

Euclid is generally considered with Archimedes and Apollonius of Perga as among the greatest mathematicians of antiquity. Many commentators cite him as one of the most influential figures in the history of mathematics. The geometrical system established by the Elements long dominated the field; however, today that system is often referred to as 'Euclidean geometry' to distinguish it from other non-Euclidean geometries discovered in the early 19th century. Among Euclid's many namesakes are the European Space Agency's (ESA) Euclid spacecraft, the lunar crater Euclides, and the minor planet 4354 Euclides.

The Elements is often considered after the Bible as the most frequently translated, published, and studied book in the Western World's history. With Aristotle's Metaphysics, the Elements is perhaps the most successful ancient Greek text, and was the dominant mathematical textbook in the Medieval Arab and Latin worlds.

The first English edition of the Elements was published in 1570 by Henry Billingsley and John Dee. The mathematician Oliver Byrne published a well-known version of the Elements  in 1847 entitled The First Six Books of the Elements of Euclid in Which Coloured Diagrams and Symbols Are Used Instead of Letters for the Greater Ease of Learners, which included colored diagrams intended to increase its pedagogical effect. David Hilbert authored a modern axiomatization of the Elements.

References

Notes

Citations

Sources
Books and chapters

 
 
 
 
 
 
 
 
 
  
 
 
 
 
 
 
 
 
 

Journal and encyclopedia articles

 
 
 
 
 
 

Online

External links 
 Works
 
 
 
 Euclid Collection at University College London (c.500 editions of works by Euclid)

 The Elements
 PDF copy, with the original Greek and an English translation on facing pages, University of Texas.
 All thirteen books, in several languages as Spanish, Catalan, English, German, Portuguese, Arabic, Italian, Russian and Chinese.

 
4th-century BC births
4th-century BC Egyptian people
4th-century BC Greek people
4th-century BC writers
3rd-century BC deaths
3rd-century BC Egyptian people
3rd-century BC Greek people
3rd-century BC mathematicians
3rd-century BC writers
Ancient Alexandrians
Ancient Greek geometers
Number theorists
Philosophers of mathematics